Valgeir Lunddal Friðriksson (born 24 September 2001) is an Icelandic professional footballer who plays as a right-back for Häcken.

Career 
On 28 December 2020, Valgeir signed his first professional contract with Häcken. Valgeir made his professional debut with Häcken in a 2–0 Svenska Cupen win over Dalkurd FF on 21 February 2021.

International career
Valgeir is a youth international for Iceland, and was called up to represent the Iceland U21s at the 2021 UEFA European Under-21 Championship.

He made his debut for Iceland national football team on 4 June 2021 in a friendly against Faroe Islands.

Honours
Valur
Úrvalsdeild: 2020
BK Häcken

 Allsvenskan: 2022

References

External links
 
 
 Häcken profile

2001 births
Living people
Valgeir Lunddal Fridriksson
Valgeir Lunddal Fridriksson
Valgeir Lunddal Fridriksson
Valgeir Lunddal Fridriksson
Association football fullbacks
Valgeir Lunddal Fridriksson
Valgeir Lunddal Fridriksson
BK Häcken players
Valgeir Lunddal Fridriksson
Valgeir Lunddal Fridriksson
Valgeir Lunddal Fridriksson
Expatriate footballers in Sweden